Eremothera refracta is a species of evening primrose known by the common name narrowleaf suncup. It is native to the southwestern United States, especially desert areas. It is an annual herb producing a hairy red or reddish green leafy stem up to about 45 centimeters in maximum height. The nodding inflorescence produces flowers with white petals a few millimeters long which turn reddish as they wither. The fruit is a straight or coiling capsule up to 5 centimeters long.

External links

Jepson Manual Treatment
Photo gallery

Onagraceae
Plants described in 1882